Lee Morton (born 23 May 1995) is a Scottish international field hockey player who plays as a midfielder or forward for Scotland and Great Britain.

He represented Scotland at the 2018 Commonwealth Games. In August 2019, he was selected in the Scotland squad for the 2019 EuroHockey Championship.

He also does hockey coaching at Sir William Borlase's Grammar School.

Education 
He studied at University of the West of Scotland graduating in 2017 with a BA (Hons) in Criminal Justice.

Club career
Morton plays club hockey in the Men's England Hockey League Premier Division for Old Georgians'. He has also played for Reading.

References

External links

1995 births
Living people
Field hockey players from Glasgow
Male field hockey midfielders
Male field hockey forwards
Scottish male field hockey players
British male field hockey players
Field hockey players at the 2018 Commonwealth Games
Reading Hockey Club players
Commonwealth Games competitors for Scotland
Alumni of the University of the West of Scotland